The PLM 241 B 1 was a high-pressure steam locomotive built in 1929 for the PLM (Chemins de fer de Paris à Lyon et à la Méditerranée) using the Schmidt high-pressure system. It was a 4-cylinder compound design.

The manufacturer was Henschel & Sohn of Germany; it was considered unusual for a French railway to buy German technology due to the deteriorating relations between the two at the time. Schmidt and Henschel seem to have been the only sources of suitable technology. 

Only one was built. The locomotive was scrapped in 1936. 

Boiler: 3-stage boiler: 
high pressure circuit: 
secondary circuit: 
low-pressure circuit: 
Power: 
Speed (attained):

External links 
 Pictures of the PLM 241 B

Steam locomotives of France
4-8-2 locomotives
Henschel locomotives
Railway locomotives introduced in 1929
Experimental locomotives
High-pressure steam locomotives
Individual locomotives of France
Standard gauge locomotives of France
Scrapped locomotives